HMS Barham was a 74-gun third rate ship of the line of the Royal Navy named after Admiral Charles Middleton, 1st Baron Barham, launched on 8 July 1811 at Blackwall Yard.

In 1826 Barham was reduced to a 50-gun ship. On 29 April 1829 she suffered severe damage when she ran aground off Bonaire; she was refloated on 30 April 1829 after her crew threw 37 cannon overboard. She was broken up in 1839.

Notable crew
 Midshipman Francis Edward Bigge, a pioneer in Queensland, Australia
 Commander John William Spranger
 Commander Baldwin Wake Walker

Notes

References

Lavery, Brian (2003) The Ship of the Line - Volume 1: The development of the battlefleet 1650-1850. Conway Maritime Press. .
Douvry, Olivier (2012) Shipwrecks of Bonaire, the warship HMS Barham wasn’t wrecked at Red Slave., GlobeDivers.org.

External links
 

Ships of the line of the Royal Navy
Vengeur-class ships of the line
Ships built by the Blackwall Yard
1811 ships
Maritime incidents in April 1829